WBOO (102.9 FM) is a radio station broadcasting an adult contemporary format. Licensed to Reedsburg, Wisconsin, United States, the station is owned by Magnum Communications.

Programming
WBOO features adult contemporary music from Westwood One, News from Fox News Radio in addition to local sporting events. It previously carried adult contemporary music from ABC Radio.

The call letters were changed from WBDL to WBOO on August 24, 2021 in a swap with the former WBOO-LP, a television station at Elk Mound that Magnum Radio then sold to Morgan Murphy Media.

References

External links

BOO
Mainstream adult contemporary radio stations in the United States
Radio stations established in 1997
1997 establishments in Wisconsin